Dame Flora MacLeod of MacLeod,  (3 February 1878 – 4 November 1976) was the 28th Chief of Clan MacLeod.

Biography
Flora Louisa Cecilia MacLeod was born at 10 Downing Street, London, in 1878, the home of her grandfather Sir Stafford Northcote, who was then Chancellor of the Exchequer. Her mother was Lady Agnes Mary Cecilia Northcote and her father, Sir Reginald MacLeod, became Chief of Clan MacLeod in 1929.  She was elected President of the clan's society and went to live with her father at the 800-year-old family seat, Dunvegan Castle in Skye, where she became a county councillor for Bracadale. In 1901, she married Hubert Walter, a journalist at The Times, with whom she had two daughters, Joan and Alice. Her husband, Hubert Walter, died in 1933.

Upon the death of her father in 1935, Flora MacLeod of MacLeod (as she would be thenceforth known) inherited the estate and was recognised as the 28th Chief of Clan MacLeod. Years later, to raise income, she opened Dunvegan Castle to tourists, turning it into a popular tourist attraction. Following the Second World War, she travelled widely, establishing Clan MacLeod Societies throughout the British Commonwealth.

She lived at Dunvegan Castle until 1973 before moving to Ythan Lodge in Aberdeenshire, where she died in 1976, aged 98. She is buried in the traditional Clan MacLeod burial ground at Kilmuir, near Dunvegan. Her grandson John MacLeod of MacLeod  succeeded her.

The Dame Flora MacLeod of MacLeod Trophy for Open Piobaireachd has been presented, since 1969, to the best bagpiper at the Grandfather Mountain Highland Games in North Carolina, USA.


Ancestry

Coat of arms

Her coat of arms are described thus:

Shield I and IV azure a castle triple towered and embattled argent masoned sable windowed and porched gules and II and III gules three legs in armour proper garnished and spurred Or flexed and conjoined in triangle at the upper part of the thigh.
Crest and mantle Upon a torse Or and azure, A bull's head cabossed sable horned Or between two flags gules staves sable, the mantling azure double Or.
Supporters Two lions reguardant gules armed and langued azure each holding a dagger proper

References

External links

 New York Times obituary for Dame Flora MacLeod of MacLeod
 National Galleries.org site

1878 births
1976 deaths
Flora
Dames Commander of the Order of the British Empire
People from Westminster
People from the Isle of Skye
British people of Scottish descent
Anglo-Scots